The Exposition Internationale d'Anvers, also known as Wereldtentoonstelling van Antwerpen, was a World's fair held in Antwerp, Belgium, between May 2 and November 2 in 1885. It covered , attracted 3.5 million visits and broke even after spending 4 million Belgian francs 
There were 25 official participating nations including: Austria, Canada, France, Germany, Great Britain, the Ottoman Empire,
Portugal, Serbia, Spain, Kingdom of Romania, the United States and some South American states. Australian wool growers sent exhibitions and won prizes.

Taking place 20 years after the accession of Leopold II of Belgium, and the same year of the creation of the Congo Free State, the fair was the first in which a Congolese village was displayed, a feature that also appeared in the later 1897 Brussels fair.

See also
Human Zoo
Exposition Internationale d'Anvers (1894)

References

World's fairs in Antwerp
1885 in Belgium
1885 in international relations
19th century in Antwerp